Nello Cristianini (born 1968) is a Professor of Artificial Intelligence in the Department of Computer Science at the University of Bath.

Education
Cristianini holds a degree in physics from the University of Trieste, a Master in computational intelligence from the University of London and a PhD from the University of Bristol. Previously he has been a Professor of Artificial Intelligence at the University of Bristol, an associate professor at the University of California, Davis, and held visiting positions at other universities.

Research
His research contributions encompass the fields of machine learning, artificial intelligence and bioinformatics.  Particularly, his work has focused on statistical analysis of learning algorithms, to its application to support vector machines, kernel methods and other algorithms.  Cristianini is the co-author of two widely known books in machine learning, An Introduction to Support Vector Machines and Kernel Methods for Pattern Analysis and a book
in bioinformatics, "Introduction to Computational Genomics".

Recent research has focused on the philosophical challenges posed by modern artificial intelligence, big-data analysis of newspapers content, the analysis of social media content. Previous research had focused on statistical pattern analysis; machine learning and artificial intelligence; machine translation; bioinformatics.

As a practitioner of data-driven AI and Machine Learning, Cristianini frequently gives public talks about the need for a deeper ethical understanding of the effects of modern data-science on society. His book "The Shortcut" is devoted to the philosophical foundations of Artificial Intelligence and its potential risks for individuals and society.

Awards and honours
Cristianini is a recipient of the Royal Society Wolfson Research Merit Award and of a European Research Council Advanced Grant. 
In June 2014, Cristianini was included in a list of the "most influential scientists of the decade" compiled by Thomson Reuters (listing the top one per cent of scientists who are "the world’s leading scientific minds" and whose publications are among the most influential in their fields). In December 2016 he was included in the list of Top100 most influential researchers in Machine Learning by AMiner. In 2017, Cristianini was the keynote speaker at the Annual STOA Lecture at the European Parliament. From 2020 to 2024 he was a member of the International Advisory Board of STOA (Panel for the Future of Science and Technology of the European Parliament).

Books
2000: An Introduction to Support Vector Machines and Other Kernel-based Learning Methods, Nello Cristianini and John Shawe-Taylor
2004: Kernel Methods for Pattern Analysis, Nello Cristianini and John Shawe-Taylor
2006: Intro Computational Genomics, Matthew William Hahn and Nello Cristianini
2014: The Last Summer: Story of Lucy Christalnigg and the End of a World, Nello Cristianini

References

External links 
 Support Vector Machines: Book and Resources
 Bioinformatics Text Book
 Personal Web Page
 Bristol University fab five among world's finest scientists; The Bristol Post  | August 08, 2014
 Five Bristol scientists named among "the world’s leading scientific minds", University of Bristol
 AMiner 2016 most influential scholars in Machine Learning
 STOA Lecture 2017

1968 births
Living people
Alumni of the University of London
People from the Province of Gorizia
Academics of the University of Bristol
Alumni of the University of Bristol
University of California, Davis faculty
Italian computer scientists
European Research Council grantees